The 2022 WNBA season was the 26th season for the Los Angeles Sparks of the Women's National Basketball Association. The season tipped off on May 6, 2022, versus the Chicago Sky.

The Sparks started the season well with road wins over Chicago and Indiana, but could not hold onto that momentum as they lost the next five games in a row.  They broke the streak by winning three of their next four games to finish May 5–6.  They would open June with a loss and on June 7, 2022, the Sparks and head coach Derek Fisher parted ways after starting the season 5–7, and Fred Williams was named the interim head coach.  Williams' tenure started with back to back losses, but the Sparks won two of their last four games in June to finish the month 2–5.  The team won its first three games in July before losing their next three.  Two wins were followed by three losses to finish July 5–6.  The team began August in the playoff hunt, but three straight losses extended their losing streak to six total and dashed their playoff hopes.  A win at Washington would be the Sparks' only win in August as they finished the season with three straight home losses.  They finished the month 1–6 and the season 13–23.

Transactions

WNBA Draft

Trades and Roster Changes

Roster

Depth

Schedule

Preseason

|- style="background:#fcc;"
| 1
| April 23
| @ Seattle
| L 68–81
| Olivia Nelson-Ododa (15)
| Olivia Nelson-Ododa (12)
| Olivia Nelson-Ododa (5)
| Climate Pledge Arena5,734
| 0–1
|-  style="background:#cfc;"
| 2
| April 30
| Phoenix
| W 87-84
| Amy Atwell (19)
| Olivia Nelson-Ododa (6)
| Jordin Canada (3)
| MatadomeN/A
| 1-1

Regular season

|- style="background:#cfc;"
| 1
| May 6
| @ Chicago
| W 98–91 (OT)
| Jordin Canada (21)
| Nneka Ogwumike (7)
| Jordin Canada (8)
| Wintrust Arena8,111
| 1–0
|- style="background:#cfc;"
| 2
| May 8
| @ Indiana
| W 88–78
| Liz Cambage (22)
| Liz Cambage (11)
| Jordin Canada (6)
| Gainbridge Fieldhouse1,456
| 2–0
|- style="background:#fcc;"
| 3
| May 11
| @ Atlanta
| L 75–77
| Jordin Canada (19)
| Nneka Ogwumike (15)
| Nneka Ogwumike (4)
| Gateway Center Arena3,138
| 2–1
|- style="background:#fcc;"
| 4
| May 14
| @ Connecticut
| L 60–77
| CanadaN. Ogwumike (12)
| CambageWalker (4)
| Brittney Sykes (4)
| Mohegan Sun Arena5,624
| 2–2
|- style="background:#fcc;"
| 5
| May 17
| Minnesota
| L 84–87
| Nneka Ogwumike (22)
| Nneka Ogwumike (8)
| Jordin Canada (6)
| Crypto.com Arena4,701
| 2–3
|- style="background:#fcc;"
| 6
| May 20
| @ Seattle
| L 80–83
| Liz Cambage (25)
| Liz Cambage (8)
| Lexie Brown (5)
| Climate Pledge Arena10,103
| 2–4
|- style="background:#fcc;"
| 7
| May 23
| @ Las Vegas
| L 76–104
| Chennedy Carter (17)
| Nneka Ogwumike (6)
| Jordin Canada (9)
| Michelob Ultra Arena4,092
| 2–5
|- style="background:#cfc;"
| 8
| May 25
| Phoenix
| W 99–94
| Nneka Ogwumike (23)
| Liz Cambage (7)
| Jordin Canada (6)
| Crypto.com Arena4,020
| 3–5
|- style="background:#fcc;"
| 9
| May 27
| @ Indiana
| L 96–101
| Nneka Ogwumike (30)
| Nneka Ogwumike (10)
| CanadaCarterSykes (5)
| Indiana Farmers Coliseum1,417
| 3–6
|- style="background:#cfc;"
| 10
| May 29
| @ Minnesota
| W 85–83
| Chennedy Carter (20)
| Chennedy Carter (6)
| CarterSykes (4)
| Target Center7,234
| 4–6
|- style="background:#cfc;"
| 11
| May 31
| Dallas
| W 93–91
| Brittney Sykes (25)
| Nneka Ogwumike (10)
| CambageSykes (4)
| Crypto.com Arena4,852
| 5–6
|-

|- style="background:#fcc;"
| 12
| June 5
| @ Phoenix
| L 74–81
| Nneka Ogwumike (19)
| Nneka Ogwumike (7)
| CanadaSamuelson (4)
| Footprint Center10,151
| 5–7
|- style="background:#fcc;"
| 13
| June 11
| Las Vegas
| L 72–89
| Nneka Ogwumike (16)
| Nneka Ogwumike (9)
| Jordin Canada (8)
| Crypto.com Arena8,200
| 5–8
|- style="background:#fcc;"
| 14
| June 19
| @ Dallas
| L 82–92
| Nneka Ogwumike (17)
| C. OgwumikeN. Ogwumike (10)
| Liz Cambage (5)
| College Park Center3,779
| 5–9
|- style="background:#cfc;"
| 15
| June 21
| Washington
| W 84–82
| Nneka Ogwumike (21)
| Chiney Ogwumike (9)
| Kristi Toliver (5)
| Crypto.com Arena3,745
| 6–9
|- style="background:#fcc;"
| 16
| June 23
| Chicago
| L 59–82
| Nneka Ogwumike (15)
| Olivia Nelson-Ododa (6)
| Kristi Toliver (6)
| Crypto.com Arena5,627
| 6–10
|- style="background:#cfc;"
| 17
| June 25
| @ Seattle
| W 85–77
| Nneka Ogwumike (24)
| CambageNelson-Ododa (8)
| Brittney Sykes (8)
| Climate Pledge Arena9,955
| 7–10
|- style="background:#fcc;"
| 18
| June 27
| Las Vegas
| L 73–79
| Nneka Ogwumike (18)
| CambageN. Ogwumike (11)
| Brittney Sykes (7)
| Crypto.com Arena4,200
| 7–11
|-

|- style="background:#cfc;"
| 19
| July 1
| @ Dallas
| W 97–89
| CambageN. Ogwumike (22)
| Liz Cambage (11)
| Kristi Toliver (7)
| College Park Center3,187
| 8–11
|- style="background:#cfc;"
| 20
| July 3
| New York
| W 84–74
| Nneka Ogwumike (22)
| Chiney Ogwumike (10)
| Jordin Canada (7)
| Crypto.com Arena5,436
| 9–11
|- style="background:#cfc;"
| 21
| July 4
| Phoenix
| W 78–75
| Nneka Ogwumike (23)
| Nneka Ogwumike (9)
| Jordin Canada (5)
| Crypto.com Arena3,340
| 10–11
|- style="background:#fcc;"
| 22
| July 7
| Seattle
| L 69–106
| Lexie Brown (16)
| CambageNelson-OdodaN. OgwumikeWalker (4)
| Jordin Canada (6)
| Crypto.com Arena6,389
| 10–12
|- style="background:#fcc;"
| 23
| July 12
| Washington
| L 81–94
| SamuelsonSykes (16)
| Chiney Ogwumike (10)
| CanadaCambage (3)
| Crypto.com Arena5,004
| 10–13
|- style="background:#fcc;"
| 24
| July 14
| Chicago
| L 68–80
| Nneka Ogwumike (16)
| Chiney Ogwumike (13)
| Jordin Canada (8)
| Crypto.com Arena5,856
| 10–14
|- style="background:#cfc;"
| 25
| July 19
| Indiana
| W 86–79
| Nneka Ogwumike (35)
| Chiney Ogwumike (10)
| Jordin Canada (8)
| Crypto.com Arena5,478
| 11–14
|- style="background:#cfc"
| 26
| July 21
| Atlanta
| W 85–78
| Nneka Ogwumike (20)
| Chiney Ogwumike (7)
| Jordin Canada (6)
| Crypto.com Arena10,021
| 12–14
|- style="background:#fcc"
| 27
| July 23
| @ Las Vegas
| L 66–84
| Chennedy Carter (15)
| Jordin Canada (7)
| Canada Samuelson (3)
| Michelob Ultra Arena7,522
| 12–15
|- style="background:#fcc"
| 28
| July 28
| @ Phoenix
| L 80–90
| Chennedy Carter (23)
| Nneka Ogwumike (11)
| Nneka Ogwumike (5)
| Footprint Center8,124
| 12–16
|- style="background:#fcc"
| 29
| July 31
| Minnesota
| L 77–84
| Nneka Ogwumike (23)
| Chiney Ogwumike (6)
| Jordin Canada (6)
| Crypto.com Arena6,857
| 12–17
|-

|- style="background:#fcc"
| 30
| August 2
| @ New York
| L 73–102
| Brittney Sykes (19)
| Brittney Sykes (6)
| Jordin Canada (4)
| Barclays Center4,891
| 12–18
|- style="background:#fcc"
| 31
| August 3
| @ New York
| L 61–64
| Nneka Ogwumike (19)
| Olivia Nelson-Ododa (10)
| Jordin Canada (8)
| Barclays Center5,315
| 12–19
|- style="background:#fcc"
| 32
| August 5
| @ Atlanta
| L 86–88
| Brittney Sykes (23)
| Brittney Sykes (7)
| Jordin Canada (8)
| Gateway Center Arena3,138
| 12–20
|- style="background:#cfc"
| 33
| August 7
| @ Washington
| W 79–76
| Brittney Sykes (21)
| N. OgwumikeSykes (6)
| Jordin Canada (12)
| Entertainment and Sports Arena4,200
| 13–20
|- style="background:#fcc"
| 34
| August 9
| Connecticut
| L 71–97
| Brittney Sykes (18)
| Brittney Sykes (7)
| Jordin Canada (6)
| Crypto.com Arena5,789
| 13–21
|- style="background:#fcc"
| 35
| August 11
| Connecticut
| L 69–93
| Brittney Sykes (18)
| Nneka Ogwumike (9)
| Jordin Canada (5)
| Crypto.com Arena4,987
| 13–22
|- style="background:#fcc"
| 36
| August 14
| Dallas
| L 88–116
| Brittney Sykes (35)
| Jasmine Walker (6)
| CanadaSykes (5)
| Crypto.com Arena7,245
| 13–23
|-

Standings

Statistics

Regular Season

‡Waived/Released during the season
†Traded during the season
≠Acquired during the season

Awards and Honors

References

External links

Los Angeles Sparks at ESPN.com

Los Angeles Sparks seasons
Los Angeles
Los Angeles Sparks